The Human Sexuality Collection (HSC) is a project at Cornell University Library, part of Cornell's Rare and Manuscript Collections, which aims to collect "primary sources" on human sexuality, with a special focus on "U.S. lesbian, gay, bisexual, and transgender history and the  politics of pornography".

It was established in 1988 by David B. Goodstein (publisher of The Advocate) and  Bruce Voeller (an early leader of the National Gay Task Force).

In 2011 it received a substantial collection of Harry Weintraub, collected since the early 1980s, which consists of more than 10,000 items related to male homosexuality, dating back as far as the 1860s, now named the Harry H. Weintraub Collection of Gay-Related Photography and Historical Documentation.

References
Gwen Glazer, Human Sexuality Collection receives gay-related photographs, Cornell University, 15 September 2011.

External links
Human Sexuality Collection 
Human Sexuality Collection (celebratingresearch.org)
List of publications (worldcat.org)

American pornography
LGBT-related mass media in the United States
Historiography of LGBT in the United States
Cornell University